La Manzanilla is a small Mexican town of approximately 2,000 inhabitants. The village is located in the southeastern corner of the Bay of Tenacatita, on the Costalegre of southwestern mainland Mexico in the state of Jalisco.  "Manzanilla" is Spanish for chamomille.
  
The town is a popular beach destination for U.S., Canadian and local Mexican tourists. Many of the residents are employed in fishing, local palapa restaurants, small hotels, and grocery stores.  La Manzanilla is approximately three and a half hours south of Puerto Vallarta and one hour north of Manzanillo by car.

It has a population of about 300 American crocodiles in the nearby nature sanctuary.

External links
Washington Post Article on La Manzanilla (12/3/06)

Tourism website

Populated places in Jalisco
Beaches of Jalisco